Yueya Lake may refer to:

Yueya Lake (Nanjing), lake in Nanjing, Jiangsu, China
Yueyaquan, lake in Dunhuang, Gansu, China

See also
Yueyahu (disambiguation)